Noolpuzha  is a village near Sulthan bathery in Wayanad district in the state of Kerala, India.

Demographics
 India census, Noolpuzha had a population of 14,133

Transportation
Noolpuzha can be accessed from Sultan Battery. The Periya ghat road connects Mananthavady to Kannur and Thalassery.  The Thamarassery mountain road connects Calicut with Kalpetta. The Kuttiady mountain road connects Vatakara with Kalpetta and Mananthavady. The Palchuram mountain road connects Kannur and Iritty with Mananthavady.  The road from Nilambur to Ooty is also connected to Wayanad through the village of Meppadi.

The nearest railway stations are at Ooty (80 km) and Kozhikode(109 km) and Mysore(115 km) and the nearest airports are Kozhikode International Airport-120 km, Bengaluru International Airport-290 km, and   Kannur International Airport, 58 km.

References

Villages in Wayanad district
Sultan Bathery area